Chithiram Pesuthadi is a 2006 Indian Tamil film.

Chithiram Pesuthadi may also refer to:
 Chithiram Pesuthadi 2, a 2019 Tamil film, sequel to Chithiram Pesuthadi
 Chithiram Pesuthadi (2013 TV series), a Tamil television drama on Jaya TV
 Chithiram Pesuthadi (2021 TV series), a Tamil television drama on Zee Tamil